Bradley Steven McStravick (born 25 May 1956) is a British athlete. He competed in the men's decathlon at the 1980 Summer Olympics and the 1984 Summer Olympics. McStravick represented Scotland at the 1982 and 1986 Commonwealth Games.

References

1956 births
Living people
Athletes (track and field) at the 1980 Summer Olympics
Athletes (track and field) at the 1984 Summer Olympics
Scottish male athletes
British decathletes
Olympic athletes of Great Britain
Athletes (track and field) at the 1982 Commonwealth Games
Athletes (track and field) at the 1986 Commonwealth Games
Commonwealth Games competitors for Scotland
Sportspeople from Plymouth, Devon